Miehe is a surname. Notable people with this surname include:

Hugo Miehe (1875–1932), German botanist
Ulf Miehe (1940–1989), German director and screenwriter